Neferkare was an ancient Egyptian ruler ("king") of Tanis during the 26th Dynasty.

Biography
He was possibly the successor of the better known king Sehetepibenre Pedubast, and should have succeeded him in around 665 BCE, just one year before Psamtik I of the 26th Dynasty proclaimed himself pharaoh.

His existence was proposed by the French Egyptologist Pierre Montet, who found in Tanis a few monuments bearing a partially erased royal titulary which was quite similar to the one of Pepi II Neferkare of the Old Kingdom. However, in one of these monuments is mentioned the goddess Mut, "Lady of Isheru", whose cult is typical of a more recent epoch. Furthermore, a cornice from Athribis bears both the cartouches of a Neferkare and a Wahibre; the latter likely is Psamtik I while the former could be this Tanite ruler.

Based upon these findings, it is likely that Psamtik, once he became pharaoh, could no longer tolerate the multitude of rulers with claims of kingship upon the Lower Egypt, and in a few years he managed to force them to become his vassals, depriving them of royal titles and ambitions. Neferkare of Tanis – who could have claimed a far more ancient royal line than that of Psamtik (since, technically, Neferkare was a distant successor of Shoshenq I of the 22nd Dynasty) – was likely the last of them, but like all others he was finally subdued around 657–656 BCE.

References

Further reading
Frederic Payraudeau, "La situation politique de Tanis sous la XXVe dynastie" in P. Kousoulis & N. Lazaridis (eds), Proceedings of the Tenth International Congress of Egyptologists, University of the Aegean, Rhodes, 22-29 May 2008 (= Orientalia Lovaniensia Analecta 241), Louvain, 2015, pp: 849–860. 

7th-century BC Pharaohs
People of the Twenty-sixth Dynasty of Egypt
Non-dynastic pharaohs
Tanis